Rita Marcotulli (born 10 March 1959) is an Italian jazz pianist and composer.

Career 
Born in Rome,  Marcotulli is  the daughter of a sound engineer who collaborated with Nino Rota and Ennio Morricone, among others. She started playing piano at five years old and graduated in classical music from the Santa Cecilia Conservatory.

Marcotulli began her professional career in the early 1980s and made her first recording in 1984. Thanks to a series of prestigious collaborations, including Richard Galliano, Chet Baker, Enrico Rava, Kenny Wheeler, Peter Erskine, and Steve Grossman, in a few years she established herself as an important figure in the contemporary jazz scene.

In 1987 Marcotulli was nominated for the Best Young Talent Award in the NPR Music Jazz Critics Poll. In 1988 she toured in the U.S. and in Europe with Billy Cobham, also appearing in Cobham 's album Incoming. In 1996 she duetted with Pat Metheny at the Sanremo Music Festival. She has also had a long-term musical relationship with Dewey Redman.

Marcotulli's style largely relies on improvisation, and her influences include Brazilian music, African music and Indian music.

Also active as a composer of incidental music and musical scores for films, in 2010 Marcotulli won the David di Donatello for Best Score as well as the Ciak d'oro and  the Nastro d'Argento in the same category for the score of Rocco Papaleo's Basilicata Coast to Coast.

Discography 
 The Woman Next Door (Label Bleu, 1998) 
 Triboh (Polo Sud, 2000)
 Koiné (Le Chant du Monde, 2002)
 Oslo Party (Pony Canyon, 2003)
 L' Amico del Vento (Egea, 2005)
 The Light Side of the Moon (Le Chant du Monde, 2006)
 On the Edge of a Perfect Moment (Incipit, 2007)
 Zapping (Egea, 2008)
 Variazioni Su Tema (S'ARD, 2011)
 Basilicata Coast to Coast (Alice, 2011)
 La Conversazione (Abeat, 2013)
 Paolo & Rita (2015)
 TrioKala (Nicolosi, 2016)

With Gianmaria Testa
 Lampo (1998)
 Altre Latitudini (Le Chant du Monde, 2003)

With Michael Benita
 Preferences (Label Bleu, 1990)
 Soul (Label Bleu, 1993)

With others
 Nauplia, Maria Pia de Vito (Egea, 1995)
 In London, Dewey Redman (Palmetto, 1998)
 Incoming, Billy Cobham (1989)

References

External links 

 Rita Marcotulli at Discogs 
 

1959 births
Living people
Musicians from Rome
Italian jazz pianists
Italian women pianists
David di Donatello winners
Nastro d'Argento winners
Italian film score composers
Women jazz pianists
Italian women composers
Accademia Nazionale di Santa Cecilia alumni
Label Bleu artists
Pony Canyon artists